Below is a list of international presidential trips made by Mário Soares as President of the Portuguese Republic.

First term (1986-1991)

1986

1987

1988

1989

1990

Second term (1991-1996)

1992

1993

1994

1995

1996

Sources 
 Fundação Mário Soares (in portuguese)

See also 
 List of international presidential trips made by Aníbal Cavaco Silva
 List of international presidential trips made by António José de Almeida
 List of international presidential trips made by Bernardino Machado
 List of international presidential trips made by Francisco Craveiro Lopes
 List of international presidential trips made by Marcelo Rebelo de Sousa

State visits
State visits by Portuguese presidents
20th century in international relations
Lists of diplomatic trips
Personal timelines